The Association for Union Democracy is a non-profit organization based in Brooklyn, New York, United States which advocates for union democracy. It defines itself as a "national, pro-labor, non-profit organization dedicated solely to advancing the principles and practices of democratic trade unionism in the North American labor movement." The organization has aided a wide variety of workers, including major reform movements such as Teamsters for a Democratic Union and Miners for Democracy. It was founded and led by Herman Benson until his death in 2020.

Notable directors
 Edward Sadlowski, labor activist
 Clyde Summers, attorney influential in labor law

References

Further reading
 Goldberg, Michael J. "In the cause of union democracy." Suffolk UL Rev. 41 (2007): 759.
 Benson, Herman W. Rebels, reformers, and racketeers: How insurgents transformed the labor movement. Authorhouse, 2005.

External links
 Official site

Union democracy
Workers' rights organizations based in the United States
Non-profit organizations based in Brooklyn